Otley and Yeadon is an electoral ward of Leeds City Council in north west Leeds, West Yorkshire, covering the towns of Otley and Yeadon (except for a southern part in Guiseley and Rawdon ward) as well as Newall.

Boundaries 
The Otley and Yeadon ward includes the following civil parishes of:
Carlton (part of Bramhope and Carlton Parish Council, although Bramhope Parish sits in the neighbouring Adel and Wharfedale ward)
Otley (Otley Town Council)

Councillors 

 indicates seat up for re-election.
* indicates incumbent councillor.

Elections since 2010

May 2022

May 2021

May 2019

May 2018

May 2016

May 2015

May 2014

May 2012

May 2011

May 2010

Notes

References

Places in Leeds
Wards of Leeds